William Jeovanny Torres Alegría (born October 27, 1976 in San Miguel, El Salvador) is a Salvadoran retired professional football player.

Club career
Torres Alegría started his career at third division Saprivas before stepping up a division to play for Liberal in 1993. He then had a lengthy spell with Dragón with whom he made his debut in the top tier of local football. He joined Águila in 2000 where he would stay for another five years but for a year with FAS in between. After short spells at second division Independiente Nacional 1906 and at Once Municipal he rejoined Águila in 2007.

Retirement and change of heart
In February 2011, William Torres announced his retirement from football due to personal reasons, but he signed with second level Dragón for the 2011 Apertura season. In January 2012 he moved to Luis Ángel Firpo.

International career
Torres Alegría made his debut for El Salvador in an August 1999 friendly match against Greece and has earned a total of 33 caps, scoring 3 goals including his first one in an unofficial game against Honduras. He has represented his country in 13 FIFA World Cup qualification matches and played at the 2003 and 2009 CONCACAF Gold Cups.

His final international game was a July 2009 CONCACAF Gold Cup match against Canada.

International goals
Scores and results list El Salvador's goal tally first.

References

External links

 Profile  - CD FAS

1976 births
Living people
People from San Miguel, El Salvador
Association football midfielders
Salvadoran footballers
El Salvador international footballers
2003 CONCACAF Gold Cup players
2009 CONCACAF Gold Cup players
C.D. Águila footballers
C.D. FAS footballers
Once Municipal footballers
C.D. Luis Ángel Firpo footballers